Timi Mulgrew (born September 16, 1992) is an American soccer player.

Career

College and Amateur
Mulgrew played four years of college soccer at George Mason University between 2011 and 2014.

While at college, Mulgrew played with USL PDL club Ocean City Nor'easters in 2013.

Professional
Mulgrew signed with MLS side New England Revolution on March 18, 2015. He was loaned to New England's United Soccer League affiliate Rochester Rhinos on April 3, 2015.

References

External links
 

1992 births
Living people
American soccer players
George Mason Patriots men's soccer players
Ocean City Nor'easters players
New England Revolution players
Rochester New York FC players
Association football forwards
Soccer players from Virginia
USL League Two players
USL Championship players
People from Sterling, Virginia